Lara Fabian is the eponymous French-language debut album by Belgian-Canadian singer Lara Fabian. It is her only album dominated by dance-pop songs instead of ballads. The album initially reached #17 in Quebec and eventually reached #3 over a year later. The majority of the album's songs received substantial airplay there. Originally only released in Canada, it was released in francophone European territories in 1999 following Fabian's breakthrough success there with the album Pure.

Track listing

Personnel
Lara Fabian - Main Vocal
B.J. Scott, Nathalie Slachmuylder, Dany Coen, Allan Dee - Backing vocals
Rick Allison - Guitars, Keyboards, Keyboard & Drum Programming
Phillippe De Cock - Keyboards, Acoustic Piano, String Arrangements
Michel Hatzigeorgiou - Bass
J.P. Onraedt - Drums, Percussion
Stephen Owen - Drum Programming, Percussion
Pietro Lacirignola, Manuel Hermia - Saxophone

References

1991 debut albums
Lara Fabian albums
Polydor Records albums
Universal Records albums